Roholla Iqbalzadeh (Dari: روح‌الله اقبالزاده, born 2 November 1994) is a Norwegian-born Afghan footballer who plays as a defender for Kolstad. He can play as leftback.

International career
Roholla made his international debut against Cambodia for the World Cup Qualification match. After this match he also played against Bhutan and Maldives.

References

External links 
 

1994 births
Living people
Afghan footballers
Afghanistan international footballers
Afghan expatriate footballers
Footballers at the 2014 Asian Games
Afghan emigrants to Norway
Association football central defenders
People from Vefsn
Sportspeople from Bodø
Byåsen Toppfotball players
FK Bodø/Glimt players
Expatriate footballers in Norway
Asian Games competitors for Afghanistan